Kaii Yoshida (born 16 May 1981) is a Chinese-born Japanese table tennis player who is ranked among the top fifty athletes in his sport.

Yoshida started playing table tennis at the age of 7 in the Hebei Institute of Physical Education under coach Liu Wenqing. He is a right handed pen hold grip player. Unlike the Chinese player Wang Hao, he only uses one side of his racket. Yoshida was spotted by a Japanese Coach in 1997. He moved to Japan and commenced his international career in competitive table tennis after completing 3 years of tertiary education and 2 years of university education. In 2004 he became a Japanese citizen.

As a singles player, Yoshida was ranked 21st in the world as of July 2010 His highest ranking was in June 2010, when he was 20th. He won his 1st Men's Singles title in the 2006 ITTF Pro Tour Serbian Open. More recently, he achieved a 3rd position in the 2008 ITTF Pro Tour Chile Open. Yoshida is also a key player for Men's Team and Doubles, and Mixed Doubles events. Together with his team, he managed to achieve 2nd position in the 2007 ASIAN Table Tennis Championships in Yangzhou, China. In addition, they clinched third position in the 2008 World Table Tennis Team Championships in Guangdong, China.

Achievements

References

1981 births
Living people
Place of birth missing (living people)
Chinese emigrants to Japan
Naturalized citizens of Japan
Japanese male table tennis players
Asian Games medalists in table tennis
Table tennis players at the 2006 Asian Games
Table tennis players at the 2010 Asian Games
Medalists at the 2010 Asian Games
Asian Games bronze medalists for Japan
People from Xinji
Table tennis players from Hebei
Naturalised table tennis players
Japanese sportspeople of Chinese descent